The office of United States Attorney for the Wisconsin Territory came into being when the Wisconsin Territory was created from the remnants of the Michigan Territory.  When Wisconsin became the 30th state in 1848, the United States Attorney for the District of Wisconsin was established.  In 1870, the state was split into two jurisdictions, the United States Attorney for the Eastern District of Wisconsin and the United States Attorney for the Western District of Wisconsin.

Wisconsin Territory

District of Wisconsin

Eastern and Western District

References

Wisconsin Territory